Exeter College is a general further education college in Exeter, Devon; it was first such college in England, and is currently the highest-ranked in the country. The College has its origins in the Royal Albert Memorial Museum, founded in 1869, and first became an independent institution in 1893 as the Exeter Technical and University Extension College. After using various different sites, the College's preceding institution moved into its present main campus in 1959, and was established in its present form as the first English further education college in 1970. The majority of its present buildings were constructed from 2005 onward.

The College is based around a campus at Hele Road, though owns several other sites around the city, and educates approximately twelve thousand students, including both sixteen to eighteen-year-olds and mature (adult) students. In addition, Exeter College jointly runs the specialist Exeter Mathematics School with the University of Exeter, with the College providing extra-curricular activities and pastoral support, and with students at the Maths School able to study one A.-level at the College. The tower block at the Hele Road campus, completed in 1963, is the third-tallest building in Exeter.

History

Origins, 1869-1893 

Exeter College can trace its origins back to the opening of the Royal Albert Memorial Museum (R.A.M.M.) in 1869. At its opening, the R.A.M.M. included a School of Science and a School of Art. In January 1891, the local government decided to use the Technical Instruction Act 1889 to either found a new technical institution in the city or to fund lectures and courses in the R.A.M.M.'s two schools. The latter option was chosen, and by June three such lectures had taken place "for the furtherance of technical education among working men", attended by six hundred and sixty people; the local University Extension Committee had sponsored two further "people's lectures", attended by nine hundred people in total. the scheme was subject to some criticism for being poorly-planned.

Preceding institutions, 1893-1970

Exeter College, 1970-present 
In 1970, Exeter became the first tertiary college in England, combining the features of a typical further education college with a sixth form college.

Buildings and sites

Hele Road building

Future improvement 

In January 2019, the College announced it would be spending £70 million on altering the Hele Road site, including demolishing the tower block and allowing the public to cross through the campus to Exeter St Davids railway station.

Organisation

Academic profile

Student life

Amenities 

Before 2018, many students at the College visited the Shakeaway milkshake bar in the nearby Harlequins Shopping Centre.

Notable alumni
 Matt Bellamy, musician
 Alistair Brammer, actor
 Jim Causley, folk musician
 Adam Devonshire, bassist in Idles
 Elliott Frear, footballer
 Luke Newberry, actor
 Joe Talbot, lead singer in Idles

References

External links
 Exeter College website
 Ofsted: Exeter College, Exeter
 University of Plymouth: Partner Institutions
 Exeter College Students' Union

Education in Exeter
Further education colleges in Devon
Buildings and structures in Exeter
Educational institutions established in 1970
International Baccalaureate schools in England